Extra-pair copulation (EPC) is a mating behaviour in monogamous species. Monogamy is the practice of having only one sexual partner at any one time, forming a long-term bond and combining efforts to raise offspring together; mating outside this pairing is extra-pair copulation. Across the animal kingdom, extra-pair copulation is common in monogamous species, and only a very few pair-bonded species are thought to be exclusively sexually monogamous. EPC in the animal kingdom has mostly been studied in birds and mammals. Possible benefits of EPC can be investigated within non-human species, such as birds.

For males, a number of theories are proposed to explain extra-pair copulations. One such hypothesis is that males maximise their reproductive success by copulating with as many females as possible outside of a pair bond relationship because their parental investment is lower, meaning they can copulate and leave the female with minimum risk to themselves. Females, on the other hand, have to invest a lot more in their offspring; extra-pair copulations produce a greater cost because they put the resources that their mate can offer at risk by copulating outside the relationship. Despite this, females do seek out extra pair copulations, and, because of the risk, there is more debate about the evolutionary benefits for females.

In human males
Extra-pair copulation in men has been explained as being partly due to parental investment. Research has suggested that copulation poses more of a risk to future investment for women, as they have the potential of becoming pregnant, and consequently require a large parental investment of the gestation period, and then further rearing of the offspring. Contrastingly, men are able to copulate and then abandon their mate as there is no risk of pregnancy for themselves, meaning there is a smaller risk of parental investment in any possible offspring. It has been suggested that, due to having such low parental investment, it is evolutionarily adaptive for men to copulate with as many women as possible, as it will allow them to spread their genes with little risk of future investment. This may therefore lead to more extra-pair copulation in men, as they are able to copulate with other women without the consequences of having to rear new offspring.

Various factors can increase the probability of EPC in males. Firstly, males with low levels of fluctuating asymmetry are more likely to have EPCs. This may be due to the fact that signals of low fluctuating asymmetry suggest that the males have "good genes", making females more likely to copulate with them as it will enhance the genes of their offspring, even if they do not expect long-term commitment from the male. Psychosocial stress early on in life, including behaviours such as physical violence and substance abuse, can predict EPC in later life. This has been explained as being due to Life History Theory, which argues that individuals who are reared in environments where resources are scarce and life expectancy is low, are more likely to engage in reproductive behaviours earlier in life in order to ensure the proliferation of their genes. Individuals reared in these environments are said to have short life histories. With respect to Life History Theory, these finding have been explained by suggesting that males who experienced psychosocial stress early in life have short life histories, making them more likely to try and reproduce as much as possible by engaging in EPC to avoid gene extinction.

However, men may also choose not to have EPCs for multiple reasons. One reason may be that long-term monogamous relationships can help form environments that will aid the successful rearing of offspring, as the male is present to help raise them, leading to an increased probability of the male's genes surviving to the next generation. A second reason that EPCs may be avoided by a male is that it can be costly to them; their EPC may be discovered, leading to the dissolution of the long-term relationship with their partner and, in some cases, lead to their partner assaulting or even killing them. Men may also avoid EPCs to minimize the risk of putting themselves at increased opportunity for STD transmission which can be common in EPCs. The partners in the EPC may be promiscuous as well leading to a higher statistical chance and probability of contracting venereal diseases; this would counter the lower incidence of STD transmission among exclusively monogamous sexually active couples. Spousal homicide is more likely to be committed by males rather than females, which may make the ramifications of EPC more relevant to women.

In human females
From an evolutionary perspective, females have to invest a lot more in their offspring than males due to prolonged pregnancy and child rearing, and a child has a better chance of survival and development with two parents involved in child-rearing. Therefore, extra-pair copulations have a greater cost for women because they put the support and resources that their mate can offer at risk by copulating outside the relationship. There is also the increased risk of sexually transmitted infections, which is suggested as a possible evolutionary reason for the transition from polygamous to monogamous relationships in humans. Despite this, females do seek out extra-pair copulation, with some research finding that women's levels of infidelity are equal to that of men's, although this evidence is mixed. Due to the increased risk, there is more confusion about the evolutionary benefits of extra-pair copulation for females.

The most common theory is that women mate outside of the monogamous relationship to acquire better genetic material for their offspring. A female in a relationship with a male with 'poorer genetic quality' may try to enhance the fitness of her children and therefore the continuation of her own genes by engaging in extra-pair copulation with better quality males. A second theory is that a woman will engage in extra-pair copulation to seek additional resources for herself or her offspring. This is based on observations from the animal world in which females may copulate outside of their pair-bond relationship with neighbours to gain extra protection, food or nesting materials. Finally, evolutionary psychologists have theorized that extra-pair copulation is an indirect result of selection on males. The alleles in males that promote extra-pair copulation as an evolutionary strategy to increase reproductive success is shared between sexes leading to this behaviour being expressed in females.

There are also social factors involved in extra-pair copulation. Both males and females have been found to engage in more sexual behaviour outside of the monogamous relationship when experiencing sexual dissatisfaction in the relationship, although how this links to evolutionary theory is unclear. Surveys have found cultural differences in attitudes towards infidelity, though it is relatively consistent that female attitudes are less favorable toward infidelity than male attitudes.

In animals
As well as humans, EPC has been found in many other socially monogamous species.<ref
 name="Gowaty and Bridges 1991a"></ref><ref
 name="bollinger and gavin, 1991"></ref><ref
 name="Evarts and Williams 1987"></ref><ref
 name="Sherman and Morton 1988"></ref><ref
 name="Reichard" /><ref
 name="Crawford et al., 2008"></ref><ref
 name="Bishop et al., 2004"></ref><ref
 name="Baker et al., 2004"></ref><ref
 name="Kitchen et al., 2006"></ref><ref
 name="Young, Spong and Clutton-Brock 2007"></ref> When EPC occurs in animals which show sustained female-male social bonding, this can lead to extra-pair paternity (EPP), in which the female reproduces with an extra-pair male, and hence produces EPO (extra-pair offspring).

Due to the obvious reproductive success benefits for males, it used to be thought that males exclusively controlled EPCs.  However, it is now known that females also seek EPC in some situations.

In birds

Extra-pair copulation is common in birds. For example, zebra finches, although socially monogamous, are not sexually monogamous and hence do engage in extra-pair courtship and attempts at copulation. In a laboratory study, female zebra finches copulated over several days, many times with one male and only once with another male. Results found that significantly more eggs were fertilised by the extra-pair male than expected proportionally from just one copulation verses many copulations with the other male. EPC proportion varies between different species of birds. For example, in eastern bluebirds, studies have shown that around 35% of offspring is due to EPC. Some of the highest levels of EPP are found in the New Zealand hihi/stitchbird (Notiomystis cincta), in which up to 79% of offspring are sired by EPC. EPC can have significant consequences for parental care, as shown in azure-winged magpie (Cyanopica cyanus).

In socially polygynous birds, EPC is only half as common as in socially monogamous birds. Some ethologists consider this finding to be support for the 'female choice' hypothesis of mating systems in birds.

In mammals

EPC has been shown in monogamous mammals, such as the white-handed gibbon. A study of one group found 88% in-pair copulation and 12% extra-pair copulation. However, there is much variability in rates of EPC in mammals. One study found that this disparity in EPC is better predicted by the differing social structures of different mammals, rather than differing types of pair bonding. For example, EPC was lower in species who live in pairs compared to those who live in solitary or family structures.

Reasons for evolution
Some argue that EPC is one way in which sexual selection is operating for genetic benefits which is why the extra-pair males involved in EPC seem to be a non-random subset. There is some evidence for this in birds. For example, in swallows, males with longer tails are involved in EPC more than those with shorter tails. Also female swallows with a shorter-tailed within-pair mates are more likely to conduct EPC than those whose mates have longer tails. A similar pattern has been found for black-capped chickadees, in which all extra-pair males had higher rank than the within-pair males. But some argue that genetic benefits for offspring is not the reason females participate in EPC. A meta-analysis of genetic benefits of EPC in 55 bird species found that extra-pair offspring were not more likely to survive than within-pair offspring. Also, extra-pair males did not show significantly better ‘good-genes’ traits than within-pair males, except for being slightly larger overall.

Another potential explanation for the occurrence of EPC in organisms where females solicit EPC is that the alleles controlling such behaviour are intersexually pleiotropic. Under the hypothesis of intersexual antagonistic pleiotropy, the benefit males get from EPC cancels out the negative effects of EPC for females. Thus, the allele that controls EPC in both organisms would persist, even if it would be detrimental to the fitness of females. Similarly, according to the hypothesis of intrasexual antagonistic pleiotropy, the allele that controls EPC in females also controls a behaviour that is under positive selection, such as receptiveness towards within-pair copulation.

References

Developmental biology
Mating
Reproduction in animals
Sexuality
Promiscuity